In chess, a backward pawn is a pawn that is behind all pawns of the same color on the adjacent  and cannot be safely advanced. In the diagram, the black pawn on the c6-square is backward.

Disadvantages
Backward pawns are usually a positional disadvantage because they are unable to be defended by other pawns. The backward pawn also prevents its owner's rooks and queen on the same file from attacking the piece placed on the hole.

If the backward pawn is on a half-open file, the disadvantage is even greater, as the pawn can be attacked more easily by an opponent's rook or queen on the c-file.  Pieces can become weak when they are devoted to protecting a backward pawn, since their obligation to defend the pawn keeps them from being deployed for other uses.

In practice

Modern opening theory features several openings in which one of the players deliberately incurs a backward pawn in exchange for some other advantage such as initiative or better . An example is the Sveshnikov Variation of the Sicilian Defence.

After the moves 1. e4 c5 2. Nf3 Nc6 3. d4 cxd4 4. Nxd4 Nf6 (or 4...e5 5.Nb5 d6 – the Kalashnikov Variation) 5. Nc3 e5!? 6. Ndb5 d6 (see diagram), Black has a backward pawn on d6, but White now has to endure a displacement of his knights and an undermining of his  after 7. Bg5 a6 8. Na3 b5 9. Bxf6 gxf6 10. Nd5 (dodging the threatened pawn-fork of the knights) 10... f5! (or 10...Bg7 11.c3 [facilitating the knight on a3 to return to the center via Na3–c2–e3] 11...f5!) 11. c3 Bg7, and so on.

See also
Connected pawns
Doubled pawns
Isolated pawn
Pawn structure

References

Bibliography

Chess terminology
Chess strategy